Jeffrey Michael Werner, ACE is an American film editor. He is best known as the editor of such films as Right at Your Door, 2 Days in Paris, Religulous, and The Kids Are All Right.  Werner co-edited the 2010 film Peacock with the late Sally Menke, as well as being an additional editor of Eternal Sunshine of the Spotless Mind.  Television work includes NBC's show Community, HBO's Ballers and Olive Kitteridge.

Werner attended the University of Oregon and completed a dual major in Philosophy and English Literature.  Werner was nominated for the 2011 ACE Eddie Award for Best Edited Feature Film (Comedy or Musical) for The Kids Are All Right. He was also nominated for the 2014 ACE Eddie Award and won an Emmy for his work on Olive Kitteridge.

Filmography

References

External links

Official Website

Artists from Oregon
University of Oregon alumni
American film editors
Living people
American Cinema Editors
Year of birth missing (living people)